Dixi is an interactive web programme for children age 7–14 that premiered on CBBC Online in 2014, that ran for 5 series, and 130 episodes. The series was produced by Kindle Entertainment.

Series synopsis
Dixi started on 24 February 2014 and is viewable on mobile, tablet and desktop platforms in the UK. There were 30 webisodes in total in the first series, which became available to watch over three weeks. Series 1 centers around Shari and others getting hacked. The culprit is Mimi's mum due to being offended over others including Shari calling Mimi 'Me Too Mimi'.

Dixi then returned for a second series. Dixi 2: Dixi Unchained, launched on Safer Internet Day, 10 February 2015 – with new vlogs and episodes uploaded to the CBBC website every weekday until 6 March 2015. Series 2 is about Mimi and others getting creepy messages from a cyber ghost called "Alice", the culprit is Connie, the sister of prime suspect Kat. This is because Connie wanted to become close to Kat again.

The launch of Dixi:3 - Game of Dixi coincided with Safer Internet Day 2016: 15 February with new vlogs, profiles and interactive content uploaded daily until 5 March Series 3 is about The Nameless One bullying people online and the Grim Griefer bullying Chloe and Syd in their game World Of Orc Craft . The culprit is Perry because of humiliation of being in viral video 'Game Over Boy', a video where he falls over while wearing a homemade robot costume.

In late 2016, a prequel to the fourth series was launched over the CBBC website, called Dixi 4 Extra. In July 2017, another prequel to the series was also launched over the CBBC website, called "Dixi 4 Escape".' This, however, was in a different format to usual where all of the characters were stuck in an Escape Room and the audience had to help to get them out by choosing what to do.

The full thirty episode series then began in October 2017, named Dixi: Friends 4 Ever. This series introduced new characters to the programme, as well as a few of old faces returning. This series was promoted like with Series 1–3, with TV adverts on CBBC and announcements and clips being released on the official CBBC website. Series 4 is about Billie and Selene being framed for trashing Miss Malik's office and the student president elections, as well as Amani's fake boyfriend Alessandro being hacked. Billie is forced to drop out. Blake is Alessandro and Billie's friend Abi is the shredder because of her dad being ill. Echo/Emma wins the election.

Then Dixi: Dracula was released, it was a cover of "Dracula" by Bram Stoker in 2018.

Broadcast
In 2016, TV Episodes were released - Season 1 + 2 were released on TV (featuring 10 episodes on TV) and in 2017, there were 12 episodes of Dixi 3.
In 2018 there were 13 episodes of Dixi: Friends4Ever. It is a television version of the mock social network 'Dixi' with friends, comments and all the mystery episodes.

Cast

 Claudia Jessie as Shari
 Jordan Loughran as Eve
 Kerry Boyne as Isla
 April Hughes as Mimi 
Bethan Wright as Chloe
 Alexander Nicolaou as Syd 
 Joseph Ashworth as Murdo
 Martin Bobb-Semple as Zane 
Ben Kerfoot as Ash
 Harry Jarvis as Ryan
 Rebecca Hanssen as Billie 
 Sereece Bloomfield as Amani
 Annie Guy as Jane 
 Alex Thomas Smith as Baxter/Bubs 
 Imogen Gurney as Abi 
 Sam Hallion as Blake  
 Sophia Capasso as Selene

Additional cast - Dixi:Friends4ever
 Marli Siu as Echo 
 Scott Folan as Django 
 Rhianne Barreto as Scarlet 
 Declan Peter Wyer as Viktor 
 Shireen Azarmi as Ms Malik 
 Darren Strange as Mr. Williams 
 David Persiva as Mr. Hayworth 
 Mollie Lambert as Addie 
 Romario Simpson as Shak 
 Adina Vlad as Lace

Award
It won the BAFTA award for Original Interactive Show in 2014.

References

External links
 
 

BBC children's television shows
2014 British television series debuts
2021 British television series endings
2010s British mystery television series
2010s British children's television series
2020s British mystery television series
2020s British children's television series
English-language television shows